The following is a list of presidents of the Rhode Island School of Design (RISD).

References 

Presidents
Rhode Island School of Design
 
Rhode Island School of Design